Juan Llabot (born 29 June 1912) was a Venezuelan sports shooter. He competed at the 1956 Summer Olympics and the 1968 Summer Olympics.

References

External links
 

1912 births
Year of death missing
Venezuelan male sport shooters
Olympic shooters of Venezuela
Shooters at the 1956 Summer Olympics
Shooters at the 1968 Summer Olympics
Sportspeople from Córdoba, Argentina
Argentine emigrants to Venezuela
Pan American Games bronze medalists for Venezuela
Pan American Games medalists in shooting
Shooters at the 1955 Pan American Games
20th-century Venezuelan people